Dozens of species of geckos are found in New Zealand. The number of species is unknown – as of 2021 there are 48 species in 7 genera, but more species are being studied. All of them are native to New Zealand and are endemic (found in no other country). They are all in the Diplodactylidae family of geckoes, which is found in Australia, New Caledonia and New Zealand.

New Zealand's geckos are highly unusual in that they are viviparous, giving birth to live young, typically twins, rather than laying eggs. Two species of rough-snouted giant geckos from New Caledonia are the only other viviparous geckos in the world.
New Zealand geckos are omnivorous – their diet is primarily insectivorous in nature – flies, spiders, moths etc., but they will supplement it with fruit (i.e. from mahoe) and nectar (i.e. from flax flowers) when it is available.

Geckos are often a target for wildlife smugglers.

Species
As at 2021 the taxonomically described species are as follows:
Dactylocnemis pacificus (Gray, 1842) – Pacific gecko or Pacific sticky-toed gecko
Hoplodactylus delcourti Bauer & Russell, 1986 – Delcourt's sticky-toed gecko, Delcourt's giant gecko, or kawekaweau (presumed extinct; uncertain if a New Zealand species – see below)
Hoplodactylus duvaucelii (Dumeril & Bibron, 1836)– Duvaucel's gecko or forest gecko. This species may represent multiple species or sub-species including the northern and the southern Duvaucel’s gecko.
Mokopirirakau cryptozoicus (Jewell & Leschen, 2004) – Tākitimu gecko
Mokopirirakau galaxias Knox et al., 2021– hura te ao gecko
Mokopirirakau kahutarae (Whitaker, 1985) – black-eyed gecko
Mokopirirakau granulatus (Gray, 1845) – forest gecko
Mokopirirakau nebulosus (McCann, 1955) – cloudy gecko
Naultinus elegans Gray, 1842 – Auckland green gecko
Naultinus flavirictus Hitchmough et al., 2021 – Aupouri green gecko
Naultinus gemmeus (McCann, 1955)  – jewelled gecko
Naultinus grayii  Bell, 1843 – Northland green gecko or Gray's tree gecko
Naultinus manukanus (McCann, 1955) – Marlborough green gecko or manuka gecko
Naultinus punctatus Gray, 1843 – Wellington green gecko
Naultinus rudis (Fischer, 1882) – rough gecko
Naultinus stellatus Hutton, 1872 – Nelson green gecko or starry tree gecko
Naultinus tuberculatus(McCann, 1955) – West Coast green gecko, Lewis Pass green gecko, or warty tree gecko
Toropuku stephensi (Robb, 1980) – Stephen's Island gecko or Cook Strait striped gecko
Toropuku inexpectatus  Hitchmough et al., 2020 – northern striped gecko
Tukutuku rakiurae (Thomas, 1981) – harlequin gecko
Woodworthia brunnea – Canterbury gecko
Woodworthia chrysosiretica (Robb, 1980) – gold-striped gecko, gold-stripe gecko, or golden sticky-toed gecko
Woodworthia maculata (Gray, 1845) – New Zealand common gecko or Raukawa gecko

Species yet to be taxonomically determined
The number of New Zealand gecko species is not settled, with new ones being described. Some animals with a wide range previously thought to comprise a single species actually represent multiple sub-species, as with the common gecko, Woodworthia maculata. A number of alpine species have emerged from high altitude discoveries in the South Island.

As at 2021 the species or subspecies that have yet to be taxonomically determined include:
Hoplodactylus duvaucelii “southern” –  a possible new species or subspecies currently included in Hoplodactylus duvaucelii
Mokopirirakau "cupola" – Cupola gecko
Woodworthia "Raggedy" –  Raggedy Range gecko
Woodworthia "Southern Alps northern” – northern Southern Alps gecko
Woodworthia “south-western” – south-western large gecko
Mokopirirakau “Open Bay Islands” – Open Bay Islands gecko
Mokopirirakau “Okarito” – broad-cheeked gecko
Woodworthia aff. maculata “Muriwai” – Muriwai gecko
Dactylocnemis “Matapia Island” – Matapia gecko
Dactylocnemis “North Cape” – Te Paki gecko
Mokopirirakau “Cascades” – cascade gecko
Mokopirirakau “Roys Peak” – orange-spotted gecko
Mokopirirakau “southern forest” – Tautuku gecko
Mokopirirakau “southern North Island" – ngahere gecko
Woodworthia cf. brunnea Cope, 1869 – Waitaha gecko
Woodworthia “Central Otago” – schist gecko
Woodworthia “Cromwell” – Kawarau gecko 
Woodworthia “Kaikoura” – Kaikoura gecko
Woodworthia “Marlborough mini” – minimac gecko
Woodworthia “Mount Arthur” – Kahurangi gecko
Woodworthia “Otago/Southland large” – korero gecko
Woodworthia “pygmy” – pygmy gecko
Woodworthia “south-western large” – south-western large gecko
Woodworthia “Southern Alps” – Southern Alps gecko
Woodworthia “southern mini” – short-toed gecko
Woodworthia “Southern Alps northern” – northern Southern Alps gecko
Dactylocnemis “Mokohinau” – Mokohinau gecko
Dactylocnemis “Poor Knights” – Poor Knights gecko
Dactylocnemis “Three Kings” – Three Kings gecko

Delcourt's giant gecko
Hoplodactylus delcourti, or Delcourt's giant gecko, is a very large extinct gecko that is known from a single, partial specimen of unknown origin in a museum in France. It is presumed to have come from either New Zealand or New Caledonia, and it has been suggested it is the kawekaweau (a large reptile) of Māori lore. However, the absence of anything resembling H. delcourti from the New Zealand herpetofaunal fossil record casts doubt on whether it is a New Zealand species.

See also
Wildlife smuggling in New Zealand
Fauna of New Zealand

References

Further reading
 New Zealand Geckos; A guide to captive maintenance and breeding, RPV Rowlands, Ecoprint, 1999

External links
New Zealand Herpetological Society

Geckos by location